Cristian Nicolae Bratu (born 24 December 1977 in Piteşti, Argeş) is a former Romanian footballer.

External links

1977 births
Living people
Romanian footballers
FC Dacia Pitești players
CSM Reșița players
FC Argeș Pitești players
FC Politehnica Iași (1945) players
CS Mioveni players
FC U Craiova 1948 players
SCM Râmnicu Vâlcea players
Romanian expatriate footballers
Expatriate footballers in Israel
Romanian expatriate sportspeople in Israel
Association football forwards
Association football midfielders
Sportspeople from Pitești